The Bristol Park & Ride is a park & ride system operated by Bristol City Council in Bristol, South West England.

History

Until 2011, the park & ride routes were operated by First Bristol and Wessex Bus. On 5 September 2011, route 904 was taken over by CT Plus using ex First London, London Central and London General Mercedes-Benz Citaro O530Gs with route 903 passing from Wessex to First.

On 2 April 2012, CT Plus took over the operation of route 902. In April 2014, route 505 was extended to Long Ashton to become a park & ride route.

In September 2014, Wessex Bus commenced operating a new park and ride service, the 901 between Portway and Clifton; this service ceased in September 2016.

The existing contracts expire in September 2016, with options to extend for a further three years.

Services
The system consists of five routes:

505: Long Ashton to Bristol Zoo and Southmead Hospital, operated by CT Plus, branded as Bristol Community Transport
PORT: Portway to Bristol, operated by First West of England
BRIS: Brislington to Bristol, operated by First West of England

Metrobus m2: Long Ashton to Bristol, operated by First West of England

Metrobus m3: Lyde Green to Bristol via UWE's Frenchay campus, operated by First West of England

Y1: Chipping Sodbury and Yate to Bristol, operated by First West of England

There has been significant, and increasing, investment in the scheme by Bristol City Council.

Benefits
The council consider that this facility has reduced city centre congestion.

The m2 and m3 services operate a buy before you board system through use of ticket machines at bus stops. This is designed to reduce boarding times.

References

Bus transport brands
Bus transport in Bristol
Park and ride schemes in the United Kingdom